David Ridgway is the name of:

 David Ridgway (politician) (born 1960), South Australian politician
 David Ridgway (scholar) (1938–2012), British archaeologist and Etruscan scholar
 Dave Ridgway (born 1959), Canadian Football League player
 David Frederick Charles Ridgway, former British Ambassador to Bolivia and Cuba